Soduku can be
a common misspelling of Sudoku, a logic-based number placement puzzle
a possible misspelling of Sodoku, a bacterial zoonotic disease
an alternate name for the carrom ball in cricket.